AS Douanes (fr:Association Sportive des Douanes de Niamey – en:Niamey Customs enforcement Sports Association) is  a Nigerien football club based in Niamey and sponsored by the government taxation police. Prior to the 2005–6 season they played in the city of Tillabéry, and have competed in the top national league since the 2004 season, when they were promoted from the regional division 2. AS Douanes has won Nigerien league once but have never won cup championship.

2008 season
AS Douanes finished in third place in Group A of the first round of the 2008 Niger Premier League. They failed to qualify for the championship round, but easily avoided the elimination playoff, meaning they will return for the 2009 season.

Achievements
Niger Premier League: 2
2013, 2015.

Niger Cup: 2
2016, 2022.

Niger Super Cup: 2
2013, 2015.

Performance in CAF competitions
CAF Champions League: 1 appearances
2014 – Preliminary round

CAF Confederation Cup: 0 appearances

References

External links
 Rec Sports Soccer Foundation: Niger 2008: Championnat national de première division.

Football clubs in Niger
Super Ligue (Niger) clubs
Sport in Niamey